The 1868 Arica earthquake occurred on 13 August 1868, near Arica, then part of Peru, now part of Chile, at 21:30 UTC. It had an estimated magnitude between 8.5 and 9.3. A tsunami (or multiple tsunamis) in the Pacific Ocean was produced by the earthquake, which was recorded in Hawaii, Japan, Australia, and New Zealand.

Tectonic setting
The earthquake occurred along the boundary between the Nazca Plate and the South American Plate. The earthquake was likely a result of thrust-faulting, caused by the subduction of the Nazca plate beneath the South American plate.

The coasts of Peru and Chile have a history of great megathrust earthquakes originating from this plate boundary, such as the 1960 Valdivia earthquake and the 2010 Chile earthquake.

Damage
The earthquake caused almost complete destruction in the southern part of Peru, including Arica, Tacna, Moquegua, Mollendo, Ilo, Iquique, Torata and Arequipa, resulting in an estimated 25,000 casualties, and many shipwrecks.

The brig Chañarcillo and two schooners, Rosa Rivera and Regalon, were also lost. The port city of Pisco was razed.

The tsunami caused considerable damage in Hawaii, washing out a bridge along the Waiohi River. In New Zealand, it is the only fatal tsunami on record, causing substantial damage on the Chatham Islands and an estimated 20 people washed out to sea. On the mainland, Banks Peninsula was hardest hit with a Maori village and two houses washed away and boats damaged, and one death was recorded.

Characteristics

Earthquake
Two separate earthquakes have been described; they may both refer to the same event.

Estimates of its magnitude range from 8.5 to 9.3. A  rupture length has been estimated from the pattern of isoseismals making it one of the largest fault breaks in modern times.

About 400 aftershocks were recorded by 25 August of that year.

Contemporary accounts say that the earthquake shaking lasted somewhere between five and ten minutes.

Tsunami
Although this event generated a tsunami that was noted across the Pacific, most of the associated damage was localised along the coasts of southern Peru and what is now northernmost Chile. The first wave arrived at Arica 52 minutes after the earthquake, with a  height, followed by the largest  wave 73 minutes later.

Future risk
In 2001 the Arica area was identified as forming part of a seismic gap between 15° and 24°S, with no major earthquake since 1877. In accordance with this theory a major earthquake was considered likely to happen in the near future. More specifically, in 2005 a magnitude 8.6 event was forecast for the northern Chile part of the gap, the location of the subsequent 2014 Iquique earthquake. An earthquake affecting the same sector of the plate boundary as the 1868 event with a magnitude of 8.8 was also forecast as likely to occur by 2126. A repeat of the 1868 event would probably cause more casualties, because of the increase of population in areas at risk.

See also
 
 
 List of megathrust earthquakes
 1877 Iquique earthquake
 2014 Iquique earthquake
 List of earthquakes in Chile
 List of earthquakes in Peru
 List of historical earthquakes
 
 List of tsunamis

References

Further reading

External links

Arica
Megathrust earthquakes in Peru
Megathrust earthquakes in Chile
E
Arica earthquake
Arica earthquake
1868 tsunamis
Arica
Arica
Arica Earthquake
Tsunamis in New Zealand
August 1868 events
1868 disasters in Chile